The Little Piney River is a  tributary of the Piney River in Amherst County in the U.S. state of Virginia.  Via the Piney and Tye rivers, it is part of the James River watershed.

The Little Piney River runs from the George Washington Forest, down Page Mountain, and feeds into the Big Piney River at the foot of the mountain. Both Piney Rivers straddle the boundaries of Nelson County and Amherst County.

See also
List of rivers of Virginia
Amherst County, Virginia
Nelson County, Virginia

References

USGS Hydrologic Unit Map - State of Virginia (1974)

Rivers of Virginia
Tributaries of the James River
Rivers of Amherst County, Virginia
Rivers of Nelson County, Virginia